"Johnny B" is a song from The Hooters' third studio album One Way Home. It was written by Eric Bazilian, Rick Chertoff and Rob Hyman. "Johnny B" was released as a single in 1987 by Columbia Records, and reached #61 on Billboard Hot 100 list. The song had considerable success in Germany, topping at #7 for two weeks.  An accompanying music video was also released, directed by David Fincher.

Cash Box said that it "is filled with musical textures that enhance the narrative and range from Old World quaintness to gritty guitar-based rock."
 
The song was covered in 1997 by the German rap group Down Low and reached #4 on the German Singles Chart. The Finnish rock band Yö has also recorded a Finnish version of the song with the title "Angelique". Czech rock band Tlustá Berta also recorded another version of this song with title "Prázdnej byt" and Nanovor with title "Už nezavolá"

Another cover was released in August 2019  by German Folk Metal Band Equilibrium, on their Album Renegades.

Track list
7" and 12" single
A side: "Johnny B" (3:58)
B side: "Lucy in the Sky with Diamonds (Live)" (4:08)

CD Maxi single (released in Germany by CBS)
 "Johnny B" (3:58)
 "Lucy in the Sky with Diamonds (Live)" (4:08)
 "Satellite" (4:08)
 "And We Danced" (3:48)

Charts

References

Sources

1987 songs
Columbia Records singles
The Hooters songs
Music videos directed by David Fincher
Song recordings produced by Rick Chertoff
Songs written by Eric Bazilian
Songs written by Rick Chertoff
Songs written by Rob Hyman